Dysgonia rectivia is a moth of the family Erebidae.

Distribution
It is known from Ghana and Congo.

References

Dysgonia
Insects of West Africa
Moths of Africa
Moths described in 1913